Oxygen is Avalon's fifth studio album, released on May 22, 2001, and produced by Brown Bannister.  The album included six singles that reached #1 on Christian adult contemporary or Christian contemporary hit radio, the most of any Avalon album to date.

A collector's edition of the album was released, including one bonus track, "Beyond the Clouds."

Track listing

Personnel 

 Avalon - vocals
 Janna Long
 Jody McBrayer
 Cherie Adams
 Michael Passons
 Dan Needham – programming (1), synthesizers (4)
 Dan Muckala – programming (2, 3, 6, 7, 10)
 Blair Masters – synthesizers (2, 5), acoustic piano (5), keyboards (6, 9), additional keyboards (10)
 Jeff Savage – programming (4, 7)
 Bernie Herms – programming (5, 11)
 Alan Pasqua – keyboards (6, 8, 9)
 Phil Madeira – Hammond B3 organ (11)
 Chris Rodriguez – electric guitar (1, 3, 4), BGV arrangements (1), acoustic guitar (4, 10)
 Jerry McPherson – electric guitar (2, 6, 11), guitars (5, 10)
 Michael Thompson – electric guitar (3, 6-9), acoustic guitar (9)
 Tim Pierce – electric guitar (6-9), mandolin (8)
 Leland Sklar – bass (6, 8, 9)
 Steve Brewster – drums (5)
 Neal Wilkinson – drums (6, 8, 9)
 Chris McHugh – drums (11)
 Eric Darken – percussion (1, 2, 5)
 Luis Conte – percussion (6, 9)
 Patrick Kiernan – violin (7)
 Michael Mellett – BGV arrangements (1, 2, 4, 10)
 Carl Marsh – string arrangements (5, 11)
 Gavyn Wright – concertmaster (5, 11), violin (7)
 The London Session Orchestra – strings (5, 11)

Production 
 Brown Bannister – producer 
 Grant Cunningham – executive producer
 Michael Mellett – vocal production (1, 2)
 Steve Bishir – recording, mixing 
 Bill Deaton – additional engineer 
 Patrick Kelly – additional engineer 
 Russ Long – additional engineer 
 Hank Nirider – mix assistant
 Jonathan Allen – strings recording (5, 11)
 Andrew Dudman – strings recording assistant (5, 11)
 Fred Paragano – digital editing 
 Steve Hall – mastering 
 Traci Bishir – production coordinator 
 Michelle Bentrem – production coordinating assistant 
 Christiév Carothers – creative direction 
 Jan Cook – art direction 
 Dan Harding – art direction, design 
 Matthew Barnes – photography 
 Gino Tanabe – stylist 
 Sheila Davis – grooming, make-up 
 Marybeth Felts – grooming, make-up
 Brady Wardlaw – grooming, make-up
 Proper Management – management

Studios
 Recorded at The Sound Kitchen (Franklin, Tennessee)
 Strings recorded at Abbey Road Studios (London, England)
 Tracks 1 & 2 mixed at Seventeen Grand Studio (Nashville, Tennessee)
 Tracks 3-11 mixed at The Sound Kitchen
 Mastered at Future Disc (Hollywood, California)

Release and promotion

Radio
Oxygen was successful on Christian radio, with all of its singles reaching #1. "The Glory," the album's first Christian adult contemporary single, was added by all 41 reporting stations its debut week. "Make It Last Forever," released simultaneously to Christian contemporary hit radio (CHR), received an initial 14 adds out of 19 reporting stations.

Sales
Oxygen sold more than 33,400 copies its first week of release, debuting at #37 on the Billboard 200 and reached #1 on Billboard's Christian albums chart.  Both chart positions represent the highest performances on their respective charts in the group's career.

Limited edition single
A CD single containing four tracks was released at Christian retail as a free bonus to customers who pre-ordered the album. The single included the album's first two singles, "The Glory" (in its radio version) and "Make It Last Forever"; "Fly to You," from the 1999 film Jesus, also presented in its radio version; and a live version of "Testify to Love" from the group's second album, A Maze of Grace.

References

2001 albums
Avalon (band) albums